Center Stage is a mid-sized concert complex comprising three separate venues located in Atlanta, Georgia. Originally known as Theatre Atlanta, the concert hall was built in memorial to a young theater enthusiast. Upon its opening in the fall of 1966, the building functioned as a performing arts theater, but has since become primarily music-focused.

History
The building, dating from 1966, has played host to a variety of uses within the performing arts spectrum and has held a handful of different titles.

1966–80s 
The building of Theatre Atlanta was largely paid for by a single benefactor, Frania Lee, heiress to the Hunt Oil fortune. The company of Theatre Atlanta originated in 1957 as a professional repertory company and Lee's daughter, Helen Lee Cartledge, was the first president of the Theatre Atlanta's Women's Guild. Lee built a home for the company as a tribute to Cartledge, who perished in the infamous Orly plane crash on June 3, 1962, along with her husband and 128 others (which made it the worst airplane disaster to date). The Atlanta Arts Association had sponsored a month-long tour of Europe and many of Atlanta's cultural and civic leaders lost their lives on the flight home from Paris.

The theatre opened its doors on October 26, 1966, with its first production, The Royal Hunt of the Sun. The venue originally seated 775 around a 130-foot wing to wing, 68-foot thrust stage. The building housed the triple-tier parking garage still operating today, as well as a gourmet restaurant, cocktail lounges, a space for costume designing and, among other things, a few classrooms for Theatre Atlanta Institute of Speech and Voice.

1982–2001 
In the early 1980s, Theatre Atlanta was phased out and the building took on the name Center Stage. Though it continued to concentrate largely on theatre, the business housed a few colorful deviations.

Video Music Channel (1982–84)
On July 4, 1982, The Video Music Channel made its first cable broadcast from the basement of Center Stage. Despite its low budget, the station showcased original programming and quickly developed a following. In 1984, the VMC seized an opportunity to step up by switching to broadcast on channel 69. Although they acquired a larger audience and fancier studio, ratings were not high enough to keep it afloat and the VMC ended in 1985.

WCW Saturday Night (1989–96) 
In the early days of Ted Turner and cable TV, World Championship Wrestling was a weekly Saturday night TV show produced by World Championship Wrestling, Inc. based in Atlanta, GA. The show was originally taped at WTBS' studios on Techwood Drive until 1989, when the location was moved to Center Stage. On April 4, 1992, the show was renamed WCW Saturday Night and relocated to the CNN Center (although months later, they would return to film in Center Stage or in Columbus, GA).

Memorable matches included WCW US Champion Konnan v. Scott Armstrong, Sgt. Craig Pittman v. Diamond Dallas Page, Sting and Lex Luger v. Public Enemy.

Current
In 2007, The CW Television Network's Atlanta affiliate WUPA began sponsoring the local theater venue in a promotional partnership with Rival Entertainment, changing the name to "The CW Midtown Music Complex."

After a brief period of title changes, the establishment made its way back to the Center Stage moniker under management by Rival Entertainment in early 2009.

Venues

Under changing management in the 2000s, Center Stage evolved dramatically and two new venues were added to the building. All three venues feature a wide variety of musical acts, as well as comedy shows and theatrical performances.

Center Stage Theater
Center Stage Theater is a Ticketmaster venue with a capacity of approximately 1,050, making it the largest of the three venues within the complex. The theater houses around 750 permanent stadium seats and features standing room on the floor in front of the stage (which can also be used as additional seating space for reserved seating shows).

Notable performances:
Hanson, Anberlin, Chris Cornell, The Dixie Dregs, Duran Duran, Lady Gaga, Skillet, Steven Wilson, Queens of the Stone Age, Sunny Day Real Estate, The Weeknd, Young the Giant and Widespread Panic.

The Loft
February 2005 marked the arrival of The Loft, located on the second floor of the Center Stage complex, equipped with four full-service bars and a view of the Midtown skyline. The Loft is a standing room only venue with a capacity of 650. Ticketing is provided by Ticket Alternative.

Notable performances:
Black Joe Lewis & the Honeybears, Fountains of Wayne, FUN, Me First & the Gimme Gimmes, Nada Surf, Rooney, Two Door Cinema Club, Kiss Rub Punch.

Vinyl
Vinyl opened on February 20, 2003, with a capacity of 300, making it the smallest of the three venues. The space has been described as a "low-key, high quality" live music venue, caters mostly to local and regional acts, and was selected for "Best Live Music" on AOL's 2010 Atlanta's Best List. The venue is mainly standing room with a handful of high-top table seating. Ticketing is provided by Ticket Alternative.

Notable performances:
Civil Twilight, James Blunt,  Sleigh Bells, Uh Huh Her.

Albums and live recordings
The venue boasts acoustics and amenities, all suited to the production of any imaginable audio, video or film project, which have included live music video shoots, full concert recordings, television show tapings, and sound stage for motion picture production and film scoring.

In 2006, Elton John spent four months recording his 29th studio album, The Captain & the Kid, in a closed in-the-round studio setting in Center Stage. The album was the second autobiographical album with lyricist Bernie Taupin, picking up where 1976's Captain Fantastic and the Brown Dirt Cowboy left off.

From 2004 to 2006, Laffapalooza, starring Jamie Foxx, was filmed at Center Stage for broadcast on Comedy Central.

External links

 Center Stage-The Loft-Vinyl on Facebook
 Center Stage Atlanta on Twitter
 Rival Entertainment Official Website

References

Concert halls in the United States
Theatres in Atlanta
Theatres completed in 1966
Music venues in Georgia (U.S. state)
1966 establishments in Georgia (U.S. state)